Sesser is a city in Franklin County, Illinois, United States. The population was 1,931 at the 2010 census.  The current mayor is C. Jason Ashmore.

History 
In summer 1904, when coal was discovered at today's Sesser, the area was a prairie covered with wheat and corn fields. By 1906, the Chicago, Burlington and Quincy Railroad had extended its lines south from Centralia to Sesser, and the new town was named after railroad surveyor John Sesser.

The first mine in Sesser, the Keller Mine, was sunk in 1905-1906.

In 1906, Sesser was incorporated as a village. It re-incorporated as a city in 1909.

Old Ben Coal Mine No. 16, also called Sesser Mine, operated from 1905-1923.

Subsidence resulting from longwall mining at the Old Ben No. 21 mine, by Old Ben Coal Company, was a concern for some local homeowners in the 1980s. The No. 21 mine, opened in 1952, was idled in 1991.

The Sesser Opera House, built in 1914, is listed on the National Register of Historic Places.

The Luna Lounge opened in Sesser, as Illinois first establishment for on site marijuana consumption.

Geography
Sesser is located at  (38.091251, -89.050608).

Demographics

As of the census of 2000, there were 2,128 people, 918 households, and 584 families residing in the city. The racial makeup of the city was 98.59% White, 0.14% African American, 0.33% Native American, 0.05% Asian, 0.09% Pacific Islander, 0.19% from other races, and 0.61% from two or more races. Hispanic or Latino of any race were 0.52% of the population.

There were 918 households, out of which 27.8% had children under the age of 18 living with them, 49.2% were married couples living together, 10.8% had a female householder with no husband present, and 36.3% were non-families. 33.0% of all households were made up of individuals, and 18.5% had someone living alone who was 65 years of age or older.  The average household size was 2.28 and the average family size was 2.88.

In the city the population was spread out, with 23.3% under the age of 18, 8.7% from 18 to 24, 25.4% from 25 to 44, 23.6% from 45 to 64, and 18.9% who were 65 years of age or older.  The median age was 40 years. For every 100 females, there were 84.9 males.  For every 100 females age 18 and over, there were 86.1 males.

The median income for a household in the city was $25,714, and the median income for a family was $33,203. Males had a median income of $31,739 versus $19,083 for females. The per capita income for the city was $15,378.  About 17.5% of families and 20.4% of the population were below the poverty line, including 36.6% of those under age 18 and 8.7% of those age 65 or over.

References

External links
 Sesser, Illinois

Cities in Franklin County, Illinois
Populated places in Southern Illinois
Cities in Illinois
Sundown towns in Illinois